The 2015 World RX of Turkey was the eleventh round of the second season of the FIA World Rallycross Championship. The event was held at the Istanbul Park circuit in Tuzla, Istanbul.

Heats

Semi-finals

Semi-final 1

Semi-final 2

Final

Championship standings after the event

References

External links

|- style="text-align:center"
|width="35%"|Previous race:2015 World RX of Barcelona
|width="30%"|FIA World Rallycross Championship2015 season
|width="35%"|Next race:2015 World RX of Italy
|- style="text-align:center"
|width="35%"|Previous race:2014 World RX of Turkey
|width="30%"|World RX of Turkey
|width="35%"|Next race:None
|- style="text-align:center"

Turkey
World RX